Love City Groove were a musical group who represented the United Kingdom in the Eurovision Song Contest 1995, with their self-titled song after being the runaway winner in a public vote. The song finished tenth with 76 points; and peaked at No. 7 on the UK Singles Chart.

Biography

Beginnings and Song for Europe
Love City Groove were formed by the producer and songwriter Stephen 'Beanz' Rudden - who at the time was a staff writer at Warner Chappell publishing company. Rudden had worked with fellow Warner Chappell writer Tatiana Mais also known as 'Q-Tee', producing one of her songs and requested that she rap over a song he had written, called "Sentence of Love". Q-Tee believing that a male rapper was also needed, arrived at the studio with Jay Williams - a student at the BRIT School For Performing Arts & Technology. Rudden had written the song at his West Hempstead studio in December 1993 where he had met Paul Hardy, who later sang the chorus, 'In the morning, when the sun shines'. In February 1994, Rudden took the rap parts and mixed them in with the new chorus track sung by Hardy. He presented the song to his A&R rep, Dave Ambrose at Planet 3 Records, which was to be released later that year. However, Jonathan King heard it at BBC and requested that the song be submitted for A Song for Europe in 1995. The final line up of the band consisted of Stephen Rudden, Jay Williams, Yinka Charles (a.k.a. 'Reason') and Paul Hardy.

After Eurovision 1995
Despite the success of their Eurovision entry which went on to sell over 200,000 copies in the UK, they had trouble repeating the trick. The follow-up "Soft Spot" missed out on the UK Singles Chart. This was followed by "J.U.M.P" which likewise did not enter the official UK listing. Their debut album Hard Times received a limited release, and sold in small quantities. The group then split from their record label, Planet 3. The band returned a year later with a cover of the track "I Found Lovin'". With several line up changes, but not much success, the group finally split up for good.

Rudden then submitted a song originally written for Love City Groove, but sung by a new group called The Collective, for an appearance in the 1998 A Song for Europe contest, to try for a second stab at Eurovision glory but ended up coming last of four performers with the song "When We're Alone (We Dream)". The track was released but missed out on the UK chart.

Solo careers
Rudden began to write and mix music for other artists, television and film. Earlier in his career in the mid-1980s, he worked with various local groups, such as Smell Funky Beast and behind the scenes programming work with British synth-pop dance band Kissing the Pink and then solo instrumental project Plutonic, releasing Mike Oldfield's "Tubular Bells" (CBS Records 1989). This landed him a contract at CBS Records in London and a publishing deal with Warner/Chappell Music. He then turned Plutonic into the first of many “group projects” he would helm with "Twilight Zone" (Sony – 1991) and, in 1992, an album for Arista Records, including the singles "One Life" (mixes by Frankie Knuckles and Mike "Hitman" Wilson) and "Sentence of Love" (with a remix by Eric Kuppa). Alongside pop co-productions and co-writes, he expanded into film music writing the title theme "Get Crafty" for the Kelsey Grammer film The Real Howard Spitz (Miramax), music for the Disney game Astro Knights as well as music for the UK pre-school series Raindrops. In 2007, Rudden released his follow up instrumental album, Blog on iTunes. It was not until 2011, that Rudden considered re-releasing "Love City Groove" and reconnected with Paul Hardy. They recorded the new single, but in this version, the rap verses were replaced and sung by Moxiie. It was then released in August 2011 on the record label Strawberry Hill, run by the group's original label head, Dave Ambrose.

Rudden also collaborated with up and coming artists as well as penning songs that were to be submitted to Eurovision artists, from his Hertfordshire home studio. Hardy continued to sing, performing tribute shows throughout the country and abroad. Williams retired from the music industry. Charles started to work with new artists. Yinka Charles, a.k.a. Reason, worked with other artists and had a new track that came out in March 2013 called "Tings Hafi Runn". Yinka also collaborated with Johnie D, Mista Stixx and Mono Chorus.

Paul Hardy, a.k.a. 'Phoenix', appeared in series 5 of The Voice UK in 2016.

References

External links

Eurovision Song Contest entrants for the United Kingdom
Eurovision Song Contest entrants of 1995
Musical groups from Manchester
Sony Music UK artists